Håkon Iversøn (born 29 November 1955) is a Norwegian former swimmer. He competed in the men's 4 × 200 metre freestyle relay at the 1976 Summer Olympics.

References

External links
 

1955 births
Living people
Olympic swimmers of Norway
Swimmers at the 1976 Summer Olympics
People from Namsos
Sportspeople from Trøndelag